Baku is the capital of Azerbaijan.

Baku may also refer to:

Places
 Baku Governorate, an administrative division of the Russian Empire
 Baku, Ghana, a town in Ghana
 Baku, Nepal, a village development committee

Ships
 Soviet destroyer Baku, a Soviet destroyer leader
 Soviet aircraft carrier Admiral Gorshkov, briefly named Baku

Arts and entertainment
 Baku (manga), by Hakase Mizuki
 Baku, the protagonist of the manga series Jibaku-kun
 Ba'ku, a fictional race in the Star Trek universe
 Baku, a character from the anime series Onegai My Melody
 Baku Madarame, the protagonist of the manga series Usogui

Other uses
 Baku (mythology), a chimeric creature in Japanese mythology said to eat nightmares
 Makana Baku (born 1998), Congolese-German professional footballer